Dharan Clock Tower (also known as Ghantaghar or घन्टाघर ) is located in Bhanuchowk, Dharan, Nepal.

The tower was constructed under the twenty-year plan of the city at the cost of NPR 5,639,000. The financial support was collected through The Dharan Hong Kong Manch, a forum of Nepalese Immigrants (most of the contributors from Dharan) from Hong Kong and Macao. The Amrit Nirman Sewa (Pvt.) Ltd., a local construction company, is built the Tower.

The Tower is designed after the Clock Tower in Hong Kong. It is 76.5 feet tall and has five stories. On the top, there is an observation platform. The platform around the tower is made so that almost 50 people can view the city at the same time. A memorial has also been constructed in the periphery of the tower in the memory of the victims of 2045 BS earthquake.

References

Clock towers in Nepal
1991 establishments in Nepal